Michael Edward Lovelace Melluish  (13 June 1932 – 8 February 2014), was a first-class cricketer and cricket administrator in England.

Mike Melluish was born in Westcliff-on-Sea, Essex, and educated at Rossall School in Lancashire. He captained the school team in 1951, his final year, setting a school record of 913 runs in the season, at an average of 70.23, and he opened the batting and kept wicket for the Public Schools in their annual match against Combined Services at Lord's.

At Caius College, Cambridge, he was a regular in the university side throughout his three years as a student from 1954 to 1956. He was secretary of the club in 1955 and captain in 1956. His batting declined (442 runs at 11.33 in 41 matches for Cambridge University, with a top score of 36) and by 1956 he was batting at number 10, but his wicket-keeping brought him 65 catches and 30 stumpings for the university, many of them off the leg-spin bowling of Gamini Goonesena.

In 1956 he played for the Gentlemen in both their matches against the Players, at Lord's and Scarborough. He played one County Championship match for Middlesex in 1957, and one first-class match for Marylebone Cricket Club (MCC), one more for the Gentlemen, and three for D.R. Jardine's XI. He played no first-class cricket after 1959. He captained MCC on a short tour to the Netherlands and Denmark in August 1963.

He served as Treasurer and President of MCC. He was awarded an OBE in the 1999 Queen's Birthday honours for services to cricket. He was a Trustee of the MCC Foundation.

References

External links
 Mike Melluish at CricketArchive
 

1932 births
2014 deaths
English cricketers
Middlesex cricketers
Gentlemen cricketers
Cambridge University cricketers
People educated at Rossall School
Alumni of Gonville and Caius College, Cambridge
Officers of the Order of the British Empire
Presidents of the Marylebone Cricket Club
Marylebone Cricket Club cricketers
D. R. Jardine's XI cricketers